The Subject is Jazz was a television program that aired on NBC in 1958. It was produced in cooperation with the Educational Television and Radio Center. Hosted by Gilbert Seldes with the musical direction of Billy Taylor, the show featured prominent jazz performers.   

One episode featured Ed Thigpen playing drums with his hands with Billy Taylor on piano.   Other episodes featured Duke Ellington, Wilbur de Paris, Aaron Copland, Johnny "Hammond" Smith, Willis Conover, Lee Konitz, Cannonball Adderley, Willie "The Lion" Smith, Marshall Stearns and others.

References

External links

The Subject is Jazz at the American Archive of Public Broadcasting
, posted by the John F. Kennedy Center for the Performing Arts Education Department

NBC original programming
Jazz television series
1958 American television series debuts
1958 American television series endings
1950s American television series